Ram Bahadur Rawal is an active journalist and news-coordinator at Galaxy 4K TV. He is also a licensed advocate of Nepal.

Career
He has an work experience of ten years in Kantipur Publications.‍ Before joining in Kantipur TV, he worked with Nepal Magazine, Nepal FM 91.8 Radio and Drishti weekly. He is currently in Galaxy 4K Television. 

He was beaten up by Nepal army personnel during the Maoist insurgency in 2005 while reporting the traditional Deuda Dance in his home district Bajura and sustained injuries on his head and eyes, the Federation of Nepali Journalist (FNJ) reports.

Awards
The Legal Journalism award-2016 by Nepal Bar Association.

References

1983 births
Living people
People from Bajura District